The Viche Formation is a Langhian (Friasian to Colloncuran in the SALMA classification) geologic formation of the Borbón Basin in northwestern Ecuador. The formation underlies the Angostura Formation. Fossils of Ziphiidae indet. have been found in the formation.

See also 
 List of fossiliferous stratigraphic units in Ecuador

References

Further reading 
 G. Bianucci, W. Landini, G. Valleri, L. Ragaini, and A. Varola. 2005. First cetacean fossil records from Ecuador, collected from the Miocene of Esmeraldas Province. Rivista Italiana di Paleontologia e Stratigrafia 111(2):345-350

Geologic formations of Ecuador
Miocene Series of South America
Neogene Ecuador
Langhian
Colloncuran
Friasian
Siltstone formations
Shale formations
Paleontology in Ecuador
Formations